Banks Peninsula is a region in New Zealand. Other uses for Banks Peninsula include:

 Banks Peninsula (New Zealand electorate), New Zealand parliamentary electorate (1996–2008)
 Banks Peninsula District, New Zealand district council (1989–2006)
 Banks Peninsula (Nunavut), peninsula located on the mainland of Canada's Nunavut territory